Sabrina Lefrançois (born 22 November 1980) is a French former pair skater. With Nicolas Osseland, she placed fourth at the 1997 World Junior Championships, 12th at the 1997 European Championships, and 17th at the 1998 Winter Olympics. She later competed with Jérôme Blanchard and won the 2004 French national title.

Programs 
(with Blanchard)

Results

With Blanchard

With Osseland

External links
 

1980 births
French female pair skaters
Olympic figure skaters of France
Figure skaters at the 1998 Winter Olympics
Living people
People from Harfleur
Sportspeople from Seine-Maritime